This list of the prehistoric life of Utah contains the various prehistoric life-forms whose fossilized remains have been reported from within the US state of Utah.

Precambrian
The Paleobiology Database records no known occurrences of Precambrian fossils in Utah.

Paleozoic

Selected Paleozoic taxa of Utah

 †Acodus
 †Agnostus
 †Amphiscapha
 †Amplexus
  †Annularia
 †Annularia stellata
  †Anomalocaris
 †Anomphalus
 †Archimedes
 †Archimedes macfarlani
 †Arcuolimbus
 †Arenicolites
 †Artisia
  †Asaphiscus
 †Asaphiscus wheeleri
 †Athyris
 †Athyris lamellosa
 †Atrypa
 †Atrypa parva – or unidentified comparable form
 †Atrypid
 †Aulopora – tentative report
 †Aviculopecten
 †Aviculopecten girtyi
 †Aviculopecten kaibabensis – or unidentified comparable form
 †Aysheaia
 †Bathyuriscus
 †Beckwithia
 †Benthamaspis
 †Beyrichoceras
 †Biscoia
 †Bolbocephalus
 †Bonneterrina
 †Bourbonnella
 †Bowmania
  †Branchiocaris
 †Brassicicephalus
 †Calamites
 †Calamites cistii – or unidentified comparable form
 †Calamites suckowii
 †Callipteris – tentative report
 †Callocladia
 †Camarotoechia
 †Campbelloceras – tentative report
  †Canadaspis
 †Canadaspis perfecta – or unidentified comparable form
 †Canadia
 †Caninia
 †Cardiopteris
 †Carolinites
 †Cavusgnathus
 †Cedaria
 †Chancelloria
 †Chancia
  †Choia
 †Chondrites
 †Chonetes
  †Cladochonus
 †Cleiothyridina
 †Clonograptus
 †Coenites
  †Composita
 †Composita mira
 †Composita ovata
 †Composita parasulcata
 †Composita plana
 †Composita subtilita
 †Composita trinuclea
 †Coosella
 †Coosina
 †Cordaicarpus
 †Cordaites
 †Cordaites principalis
Crania
 †Cravenoceras
 †Crepicephalus
 †Cruziana
  †Ctenospondylus
 †Cybelopsis
 †Cyclopteris
 †Cystodictya
 †Deiracephalus
 Dentalium
  †Diadectes
 †Diagoniella
 †Dictyonema
  †Didymograptus
 †Didymograptus nitidus – or unidentified comparable form
 †Dimeropygiella
 †Diplorrhina
 †Donaldina
 †Dresbachia
 †Echinaria
  †Ectosteorhachis – or unidentified related form
 †Ehmaniella
 †Eldonia
 †Eleutherocentrus
  †Elrathia
 †Elrathina
 †Emeraldella
 †Endoceras
  †Eryops
 †Euptychaspis
 †Fenestella
 †Forteyops
 †Genevievella
 †Girvanella
 †Gnathodus
 †Gogia
 †Goniatites
 †Gunterichthys – type locality for genus
 †Hamptonia
 †Haplophrentis
 †Hazelia
  †Helicoprion
 †Hematites
 †Hemirhodon
 †Hindia
 †Hintzeia
 †Homagnostus
 †Huronia
 †Hyolithellus
 †Hyolithes
 †Idiognathodus
  †Illaenus
 †Irvingella
 †Jeffersonia
 †Kanoshia
 †Kawina
 †Kingstonia
 †Kirkella
 †Komia
 †Kootenia
 †Lachnostoma
  †Leanchoilia
 †Lejopyge
  †Lepidodendron
 †Lepidodendron aculeatum
 †Lepidodendron obovatum
 †Lepidophyllum
 †Lepidostrobus
 †Leptomitus
 Lima
 Limatula
Lingula
  †Lingulella
 †Llanoaspis
 †Lochriea
 †Lonchocephalus
 †Lyracystis
 †Margaretia
 †Margaretia dorus
 †Marpolia
 †Matthevia
  †Metacoceras
 †Meteoraspis
 †Micromitra
 Modiolus – report made of unidentified related form or using admittedly obsolete nomenclature
 †Mollisonia
 †Morania
 †Naraoia
 †Naticopsis
 †Neospirifer
 †Neospirifer cameratus
 †Neospirifer kansasensis
 †Neospirifer triplicatus
  †Neuropteris
 †Neuropteris gigantea
 †Neuropteris heterophylla
 †Niobe – tentative report
 †Nisusia
 †Norwoodia
 †Obolus
 †Ogygopsis
 †Olenellus
 †Olenoides
 †Olenoides nevadensis
 †Olenoides serratus
  †Ophiacodon
 †Ophiacodon navajovicus
 †Orthis
 †Oryctocephalus
 †Ottoia
 †Ottoia prolifica
 †Ozarkodina
  †Pagetia
 †Paladin
Palaeoaplysina
 †Palaeoscolex
  †Pelagiella
 †Pentamerus
 †Peronopsis
 †Peronopsis interstricta
 †Perspicaris
 †Phillipsia
 †Phyllograptus
 Pinna – report made of unidentified related form or using admittedly obsolete nomenclature
 †Platycrinites
  †Platyhystrix – or unidentified comparable form
 †Platyhystrix rugosus
 †Prodentalium
 †Prohedinia
 †Protopliomerella
 †Protospongia
 †Ptychagnostus
  †Ptychagnostus atavus
 †Pugnax
 †Punka
 †Quadratia
 †Rayonnoceras
  †Receptaculites
 †Ribeiria
 †Rusophycus
  †Saukiella
 †Scenella
 †Schmalenseeia
 †Schwagerina
 †Scolicia
 †Selkirkia
 †Selkirkia columbia – or unidentified comparable form
 †Sidneyia
 †Sigillaria
 †Sigillaria brardii
 Sphenacodon
 †Sphenophyllum
 †Sphenophyllum angustifolium
 †Sphenophyllum verticillatum
 †Sphenopteris
 †Spinofacia – type locality for genus
  †Spirifer
 †Spirifer centronatus
 †Spirifer opimus
 †Spiriferina
 Spirorbis
 †Stenorhachis – tentative report
  †Stigmaria
 †Syringopora
 †Teichichnus – tentative report
 †Terranovella
 †Tetragraptus
 †Thalassinoides – tentative report
 †Tricrepicephalus
 †Trigonocercella
 †Trinodus
 †Triplagnostus
 †Trocholites
  †Tseajaia
 †Tseajaia campi – type locality for species
 †Tuzoia
  †Utaherpeton – type locality for genus
 †Vauxia
 †Walcottoceras – tentative report
 †Waptia
 †Waptia fieldensis – or unidentified comparable form
 †Weeksina
 †Wilkingia
  †Wiwaxia
 †Wiwaxia corrugata
 †Worthenia
 †Xenacanthus – or unidentified related form
 †Yuknessia
 †Zacanthoides
 †Zittelloceras

Mesozoic

Selected Mesozoic taxa of Utah

 †Abydosaurus – type locality for genus
 †Abydosaurus mcintoshi – type locality for species
 †Acristavus
 †Acristavus gagslarsoni
 †Adelolophus – type locality for genus
 †Adelolophus hutchisoni – type locality for species
 †Adocus
 †Alamosaurus
 †Alamosaurus sanjuanensis
  †Albanerpeton
 †Albanerpeton cifellii – type locality for species
 †Albanerpeton galaktion
 †Albanerpeton gracilis
 †Albanerpeton nexuosus
 †Allocrioceras
  †Allosaurus
 †Allosaurus fragilis
  †Alphadon
 †Alphadon attaragos
 †Alphadon eatoni – type locality for species
 †Alphadon halleyi
 †Alphadon marshi – or unidentified comparable form
 †Alphadon sahnii
 †Amblotherium
 †Ameribaatar – type locality for genus
 †Ameribaatar zofiae – type locality for species
  Amia
 †Anaflemingites
 †Anasibirites
 †Anasibirites angulosus
 †Anasibirites bastini
 †Anasibirites hircinus
 †Anasibirites kingianus
 †Anasibirites mojsisovicsi
 †Anasibirites multiformis
 †Anasibirites tenuistriatus
 †Anchisauripus
 †Anemia
  †Animantarx – type locality for genus
 †Animantarx ramaljonesi – type locality for species
 Anomia
  †Anomoepus
 †Apatopus
  †Apatosaurus
 †Apatosaurus louisae – type locality for species
 †Araeodon
  †Araucarioxylon
 †Arctoceras
 †Arctoprionites
 †Arvinachelys – type locality for genus
 †Aspenites
 Astarte
 Asteriacites
 †Astroconodon
 †Astroconodon delicatus – type locality for species
 †Atreipus
  †Aublysodon – tentative report
 †Baena
  †Barosaurus
 †Barosaurus lentus
 †Basilemys
 †Bernissartia
 †Brachauchenius
 †Brachauchenius lucasi
 †Brachiosaurus
 †Brachyphyllum
 †Brontomerus – type locality for genus
 †Brontomerus mcintoshi – type locality for species
 †Brontopodus
  †Brontosaurus
 †Brontosaurus parvus
 †Bryceomys
 †Bryceomys fumosus – type locality for species
 †Bryceomys hadrosus
 †Bryceomys intermedius – type locality for species
  †Calycoceras
  †Camarasaurus – type locality for genus
 †Camarasaurus lentus – type locality for species
 Campeloma
 †Camptosaurus
 †Camptosaurus dispar
 †Carmelopodus – type locality for genus
 †Cassiope
 †Cedaromys
 †Cedaromys bestia – type locality for species
 †Cedaromys parvus – type locality for species
 †Cedarosaurus – type locality for genus
 †Cedarosaurus weiskopfae – type locality for species
 †Cedarpelta – type locality for genus
 †Cedarpelta bilbeyhallorum – type locality for species
  †Cedrorestes – type locality for genus
 †Cedrorestes crichtoni – type locality for species
 †Ceratodus
  †Ceratosaurus
 †Ceratosaurus nasicornis
 Cerithiopsis
 †Chamops
  †Chinlea – type locality for genus
 †Chirotherium
 †Chirotherium rex – or unidentified comparable form
 Chlamys
 †Chondrites
 †Cimexomys
 †Cimexomys antiquus – or unidentified comparable form
 †Cimolodon
 †Cimolodon electus
 †Cimolodon nitidus – or unidentified comparable form
 †Cimolodon similis
  †Cimolomys
 †Cimolomys clarki
 †Cimolomys milliensis – type locality for species
 Cladophlebis
 †Cladophlebis constricta
 †Cladophlebis parva
 †Claraia
 †Coelophysis – tentative report
  †Coelurus
 †Coelurus fragilis
 †Compsemys
 †Coniophis
  Corbula
 †Cretorectolobus
 †Ctenacodon
 †Cteniogenys
 Cucullaea
  †Cycadeoidea
 Cylichna
 †Dakotamys
 †Dakotamys malcolmi – type locality for species
 †Dakotasuchus
 †Dakotasuchus kingi
  †Deinonychus
 †Denazinemys
 †Denazinemys nodosa
 Dentalium
  †Diabloceratops – type locality for genus
 †Diabloceratops eatoni – type locality for species
 †Dinehichnus – type locality for genus
 †Dinochelys – type locality for genus
  †Diplodocus
 †Diplodocus hallorum
 †Diplodocus longus
 Discinisca – report made of unidentified related form or using admittedly obsolete nomenclature
 †Docodon
 †Dolichorhynchops
 †Dolichorhynchops tropicensis – type locality for species
  †Doswellia
 †Dryolestes
 †Dryosaurus
 †Dryosaurus altus
 †Dystrophaeus – type locality for genus
 †Dystrophaeus viaemalae – type locality for species
 Elliptio
  †Enchodus
 †Enneabatrachus
 †Entradasuchus – type locality for genus
 †Entradasuchus spinosus – type locality for species
 †Eocephalites
 †Eodelphis
  †Eolambia – type locality for genus
 †Eolambia caroljonesa – type locality for species
 †Eopolycotylus – type locality for genus
 †Eopolycotylus rankini – type locality for species
 †Equisetum
 †Eryma
 †Eucalyptus
 †Eunaticina
 †Euomphaloceras
 †Euspira
 †Euthlastus
 †Eutretauranosuchus
 †Exogyra
 †Exogyra acroumbonata
 †Exogyra levis
 †Fabrosaurus – tentative report
  †Falcarius – type locality for genus
 †Falcarius utahensis – type locality for species
 Ficus
 †Flemingites
  †Gastonia – type locality for genus
 †Gastonia burgei – type locality for species
 †Geminiraptor
 †Geminiraptor suarezarum
 †Germanonautilus – tentative report
 †Gervillaria
  †Gervillia
 Gleichenia
 †Glirodon – type locality for genus
 †Glirodon grandis – type locality for species
 Globularia – tentative report
 †Glyptops
 †Gondolella
 †Gondolella planata
 †Goniobasis – tentative report
  †Goniopholis
 †Grallator
 †Gryphaea
  †Gryposaurus
 †Gryposaurus monumentensis – type locality for species
 †Hagryphus – type locality for genus
 †Hagryphus giganteus – type locality for species
 †Hamulus – tentative report
 †Hausmania
 †Hedenstroemia
 †Hemicalypterus – type locality for genus
  †Hippodraco – type locality for genus
 †Hippodraco scutodens – type locality for species
 †Hispanosauropus
 †Homalopoma
 †Hoplitosaurus – or unidentified comparable form
  †Hoplosuchus – type locality for genus
 †Hoplosuchus kayi – type locality for species
 †Hybodus
  †Iguanacolossus – type locality for genus
 †Iguanacolossus fortis – type locality for species
 †Iguanodon
 †Iguanodon ottingeri – type locality for species
 Ilex
 †Ilex serrata
  †Inoceramus
 †Inoceramus albertensis – or unidentified comparable form
 †Inoceramus flavus
 †Inoceramus gilberti
 †Inoceramus koeneni
 †Inoceramus pictus
 †Inoceramus tenuistriatus – tentative report
 †Inoceramus undabundus
 †Inyoites
 †Inyoites beaverensis – type locality for species
 †Inyoites oweni
 †Iridotriton – type locality for genus
 †Ischyrhiza – or unidentified comparable form
  Isognomon
 †Janumys – type locality for genus
 †Janumys erebos – type locality for species
 †Janumys erebros
 †Jugulator
 †Jugulator amplissimus
  †Kallirhynchia
 †Kamerunoceras
 †Kayentapus
 †Koparion – type locality for genus
 †Koparion douglassi – type locality for species
  †Kosmoceratops – type locality for genus
 †Kosmoceratops richardsoni – type locality for species
 †Kouphichnium
 †Leidyosuchus
 †Lepidotes
 Lepisosteus
 †Leptalestes
 Lima
 †Lissodus
 †Lonchidion
 Lopha
 Lucina
  †Lythronax – type locality for genus
 †Lythronax argestes – type locality for species
  †Machairoceratops – type locality for genus
 †Machairoceratops cronusi – type locality for species
 †Macroelongatoolithus
 Magnolia
 †Mammites
 †Marshosaurus – type locality for genus
 †Marshosaurus bicentesimus – type locality for species
 †Martharaptor – type locality for genus
 †Martharaptor greenriverensis – type locality for species
 †Meekoceras
 †Meekoceras davisi
 †Meekoceras gracilitatis
 †Meekoceras millardense – type locality for species
 †Meekoceras olivieri – type locality for species
 †Megalosauripus
 †Megasphaeroceras
 †Melvius
 †Melvius chauliodous – or unidentified comparable form
  †Meniscoessus
 †Meniscoessus intermedius
 †Mesodma
 †Mesodma formosa – or unidentified comparable form
 †Mesodma hensleighi – or unidentified comparable form
 †Mesodma minor – or unidentified comparable form
 †Mesodma thompsoni – or unidentified comparable form
 †Metoicoceras
 †Metoicoceras geslinianum
  †Moabosaurus – type locality for genus
 Modiolus
 †Monanthesia
 †Myledaphus
 †Myledaphus bipartitus
  †Myophorella
 †Myophorella livinigstonensis
 †Myophorella monatanaensis
 †Myophorella yellowstonensis
  †Myophoria
 †Mytilus
 †Naomichelys
  †Nasutoceratops – type locality for genus
 †Nasutoceratops titusi – type locality for species
 †Naticopsis
 †Naticopsis depressispira
 †Naticopsis fenestravella – type locality for species
 †Naticopsis utahensis – type locality for species
 †Nedcolbertia – type locality for genus
 †Neocardioceras
 †Neocardioceras juddii
  †Nerinea – tentative report
 Neritina
 †Nezpercius
 †Normannites – tentative report
  †Nothronychus
 †Nothronychus graffami – type locality for species
 Nucula
 †Odaxosaurus
 †Odaxosaurus piger – or unidentified comparable form
 †Odaxosaurus priscus
 †Odaxosaurus roosevelti – type locality for species
 †Opisthias
 †Ornithomimus
 Ostrea
  †Othnielosaurus
 †Othnielosaurus consors
 †Otozoum
 †Ovaloolithus
 †Ovaloolithus tenuisus – type locality for species
 †Ovaloolithus utahensis – type locality for species
 †Owenites
 †Owenites carpenteri
 †Owenites koeneni
  †Pagiophyllum
 †Palmulasaurus – type locality for genus
 †Palmulasaurus quadratus – type locality for species
 †Paracimexomys
 †Paracimexomys judithae – or unidentified comparable form
 †Paracimexomys magnus
 †Paracimexomys perplexus – type locality for species
 †Paracimexomys priscus – or unidentified comparable form
 †Paracimexomys robisoni – type locality for species
 †Paramacellodus
  †Parasaurolophus
 †Parasaurolophus cyrtocristatus
 †Paronychodon – or unidentified comparable form
  †Parotosuchus
 †Peloroplites – type locality for genus
 †Peloroplites cedrimontanus – type locality for species
 Pholadomya
 †Pholadomya inaequiplicata
 †Pholadomya kingi
 †Pinacosuchus – type locality for genus
 †Pinacosuchus mantiensis – type locality for species
 Pinna
 †Pistia – report made of unidentified related form or using admittedly obsolete nomenclature
  †Placenticeras
 †Placenticeras cumminsi
 †Plagiostoma
 †Planicoxa – type locality for genus
 †Planicoxa venenica – type locality for species
 †Planolites
 †Pleuronautilus
 Pleurotomaria – tentative report
 Plicatula
  †Poposaurus
 †Poposaurus gracilis
 †Preprismatoolithus
 †Priacodon
 †Prismatoolithus
 †Prismatoolithus jenseni – type locality for species
 †Proplacenticeras
 †Protocardia
  †Pseudomelania
 †Pseudotetrasauropus
 †Pteraichnus
 †Pteraichnus saltwashensis – or unidentified comparable form
 †Pteraichnus stokesi – or unidentified comparable form
 Pycnodonte
 †Pycnodonte newberryi
  †Redondasaurus
 †Redondasaurus gregorii
 †Rhadinosteus – type locality for genus
 †Rhadinosteus parvus – type locality for species
 †Rhynchonella – report made of unidentified related form or using admittedly obsolete nomenclature
 †Richardoestesia
 †Richardoestesia isosceles – or unidentified comparable form
 Rogerella
 Salix
  †Sauropelta – or unidentified comparable form
 †Scapherpeton
 †Schillerosaurus – type locality for genus
 †Scotiophryne
 †Scoyenia
  †Seitaad – type locality for genus
 †Seitaad ruessi – type locality for species
 †Semionotus
 †Semionotus kanabensis – type locality for species
 Serpula
 †Sexta
  †Siats – type locality for genus
 †Siats meekerorum – type locality for species
 †Skolithos
 Solemya
  †Spheroolithus
 Spirorbis – report made of unidentified related form or using admittedly obsolete nomenclature
 †Squatirhina
 †Squatirhina americana
 †Stagonolepis
 †Stegopodus – type locality for genus
  †Stegosaurus
 †Stegosaurus stenops – or unidentified comparable form
 †Stegosaurus ungulatus
 †Stephanoceras
 †Stokesosaurus – type locality for genus
 †Stokesosaurus clevelandi – type locality for species
 †Talos – type locality for genus
 †Talos sampsoni – type locality for species
 †Tanycolagreus
 †Tanycolagreus topwilsoni
  †Tempskya
 †Tempskya jonesii – type locality for species
 †Tempskya knowltoni
 †Tempskya minor
 †Tempskya superba
 †Tempskya whiteheadi – type locality for species
 †Tenontosaurus
  †Teratophoneus – type locality for genus
 †Teratophoneus curriei – type locality for species
 Teredolites
 †Tetrasauropus
 †Thalassinoides
 †Therangospodus – type locality for genus
 †Theretairus
 Thracia
 †Torvosaurus
 †Toxolophosaurus – or unidentified comparable form
 †Trachodon
  †Triceratops
 †Triconolestes – type locality for genus
 †Triconolestes curvicuspis – type locality for species
 †Trigonia
 †Trigonia americana
 †Trigonia elegantissima
 †Trigonia montanaensis
 †Trinacromerum
 †Trinacromerum bentonianum – tentative report
 †Trisauropodiscus
 Turritella
  †Tyrannosauripus – type locality for genus
 †Ussurites
 †Ussurites hosei
 †Utahceratops – type locality for genus
 †Utahceratops gettyi – type locality for species
  †Utahraptor – type locality for genus
 †Utahraptor ostrommaysi – type locality for species
 †Uteodon
 †Uteodon aphanoecetes
 Valvata
  †Vancleavea
 †Vancleavea campi
 †Venenosaurus – type locality for genus
 †Venenosaurus dicrocei – type locality for species
 †Vex
 Viviparus
 †Worthenia
 †Worthenia windowblindensis – type locality for species
 †Wyomingites
 †Xenoceltites
 †Xenoceltites cordilleranus
 †Xenoceltites subevolutus
  †Yurgovuchia – type locality for genus
 †Yurgovuchia doellingi – type locality for species
  †Zamites
 †Zamites powelli
 †Zamites tidwellii – type locality for species

Cenozoic

Selected Cenozoic taxa of Utah

 Abies
 †Acrocera
 †Agriochoerus
 Alligator
  †Allognathosuchus – or unidentified comparable form
 Amia
 Amyda
 †Anosteira
 Anthonomus
 Antilocapra
 †Antilocapra americana – or unidentified comparable form
 Apalone
  †Arctodus
 †Arctodus simus
 †Artemisia
 †Baena
 †Basirepomys
 †Bembidium
 Bison
  †Bison latifrons – tentative report
 †Bittacus
 †Bootherium
 †Bootherium bombifrons
 †Boverisuchus
 †Boverisuchus vorax – type locality for species
 †Brachyhyops
 Brachylagus
 †Brachylagus idahoensis – or unidentified comparable form
  †Camelops
 †Camelops hesternus – or unidentified comparable form
 Camponotus
 Canis
  †Canis dirus – or unidentified comparable form
 †Canis latrans – tentative report
 †Canis lupus
 †Catopsalis
 †Catopsalis fissidens
 †Champsosaurus
 Chara
 Cheilosia
 †Chipetaia
 †Chipetaia lamporea – type locality for species
 †Chisternon
 †Chriacus
 †Colodon
 †Compsemys
 †Coniatus
  †Coryphodon
 Crocodylus
 †Crocodylus acer – type locality for species
 †Crocodylus affinis
 Culex
 †Cuterebra
 Dicranomyia
 †Dinohippus
 †Diplacodon
 †Diprionomys
 †Duchesnehippus
 †Duchesneodus
 †Echmatemys
 †Ectoconus
 †Elliptio
  †Eobasileus
 †Eobasileus cornutus
 †Eoconodon
 †Eonessa – type locality for genus
 †Eonessa anaticula – type locality for species
 †Epicaerus
 †Epihippus
 †Epiphanis
 Equus
 †Equus conversidens – tentative report
 Erethizon
 †Erethizon dorsatum – tentative report
 †Eucastor
  †Euglossopteryx – type locality for genus
 †Euglossopteryx biesmeijeri – type locality for species
 Eutamias
 †Eutamias minimus
 †Goniacodon
 †Hadrianus
 †Haplolambda – or unidentified comparable form
  †Harpagolestes
 †Helaletes
 †Helodermoides – tentative report
 †Herpetotherium
 †Heteraletes
 †Hoplochelys
  †Hyaenodon
 †Hyaenodon vetus – or unidentified comparable form
 Hydrobia – or unidentified comparable form
 †Hylobius
 †Hyopsodus
 †Hypohippus
 †Hypolagus
 †Hyrachyus
 †Hyracodon
 †Hyracotherium
 †Hyracotherium vasacciense
 †Kimbetohia
 Laccophilus
 †Lambdotherium
 Lemmiscus
 †Lemmiscus curtatus
  Lepisosteus
  †Leptomeryx
 †Leptoreodon
 †Leptotragulus
 Lepus
 †Lepus townsendii – or unidentified comparable form
 †Limnocyon
 †Limnocyon verus – or unidentified comparable form
 Lynx
 †Lynx canadensis – or unidentified comparable form
 †Mammut
 †Mammut americanum
 †Mammuthus
 †Mammuthus columbi
  †Mammuthus primigenius
 †Megalonyx
 †Megalonyx jeffersonii
 †Menops
 †Merriamoceros
  †Mesonyx
 †Mesonyx obtusidens
 †Metaliomys – type locality for genus
 †Metarhinus
 †Metatelmatherium
  †Miacis
 †Microsyops
 Microtus
 †Microtus montanus
 †Miocyon
 Mustela
 †Mustela richardsonii – tentative report
 †Nemotelus
Neogale
†Neogale vison
 †Neoplagiaulax
 †Neoplagiaulax macintyrei
  Neotamias
 Neotoma
 †Notharctus
  †Notharctus tenebrosus – or unidentified comparable form
 Odocoileus
 Ondatra
 †Oodectes – tentative report
 Ophryastes
 †Oxyacodon
  †Paramylodon
 †Paramylodon harlani – or unidentified comparable form
 †Paramys
 †Parectypodus
 †Paronychomys
  †Peratherium
 Peromyscus
 †Peromyscus maniculatus
 Phenacomys
 †Phenacomys intermedius
 Phyllobius
 †Phyllophaga
 Physa
 Picea
 Pinus
 †Plastomenoides
 Plecia
 †Poabromylus
 †Poebrodon
 †Polemonium – or unidentified comparable form
  †Presbyornis – type locality for genus
 †Procaimanoidea – type locality for genus
 †Procaimanoidea utahensis – type locality for species
 †Procas
 †Procynodictis
 †Prodaphaenus
 †Protitanotherium
 †Protylopus
  †Proviverra
  †Ptilodus
 †Ptilodus mediaevus
 †Ptilodus tsosiensis – or unidentified comparable form
 Rhinoclemmys – report made of unidentified related form or using admittedly obsolete nomenclature
 †Saniwa
 †Saniwa ensidens
 †Sargus
 †Sinopa
 †Smilodectes
 †Smilodectes gracilis
  †Smilodon
 †Smilodon fatalis – or unidentified comparable form
 Sorex
 †Sorex palustris
 Spermophilus
 †Spermophilus armatus – or unidentified comparable form
 †Sphenocoelus
 †Sthenodectes
 †Stygimys
 †Stygimys kuszmauli
 †Stylemys
  †Stylinodon
  †Taeniolabis
 †Taeniolabis taoensis
  †Tapocyon
 Taxidea
 †Taxidea taxus
 Thomomys
 †Thomomys talpoides
 †Trogosus
 †Tylocephalonyx
 †Uintacyon
  †Uintatherium
 †Valenia
 †Viverravus
 Viviparus
 Vulpes
 †Vulpes vulpes
 Zapus

References

 

Lists of prehistoric life in the United States
Utah-related lists